{{Infobox Ethnic group
|group=Hopland Band of Pomo Indians of the Hopland Rancheria
|popplace=
|rels=Roundhouse religion, Christianity, Kuksu
|langs=English, Pomoan languages
|related=Pomo tribes
|population=700<ref name="CA Tribal Courts"> Retrieved 12 September 2017.</ref>}}
The Hopland Band of Pomo Indians of the Hopland Rancheria is a federally recognized tribe of Pomo people in Mendocino County, California, south of Ukiah. The Hopland Band Pomos traditionally lived in the Sanel Valley.

Reservation

The Hopland Pomo's reservation is the Hopland Rancheria. Approximately 700 tribal members live in the area and 50 on the ranchería. The Rancheria was established in 1907 and is  large.

Government
The Hopland Pomo ratified their constitution on August 20, 1981, which established a governing 7-person council.

The tribe conducts business from Hopland, California.

Services and programs
The Hopland Band of Pomo Indians has a tribal education program, EPA office, health department, utility department, police department, court system, and economic development corporation. The tribe owns and operates the Hopland Sho-Ka-Wah Casino, located east of Hopland.

 Disenrollment 
In 2016, the Hopland Band disenrolled 74 members of the tribe, ostensibly to remedy mistakes stemming from faulty processing of applications.

 Notable members 
 Susan Billy, basket maker
 Susan Santiago Billy (1884–1968), basket maker

See also
Pomo people

Notes

References
 Pritzker, Barry M. A Native American Encyclopedia: History, Culture, and Peoples''. Oxford: Oxford University Press, 2000. 

Pomo tribe
Native American tribes in California
Native American tribes in Mendocino County, California
Federally recognized tribes in the United States